The Leduc Formation is a stratigraphic unit of Late Devonian (Frasnian) age in the Western Canada Sedimentary Basin.

The Leduc Formation is a major source of oil and gas in central Alberta, and the drilling of the highly successful Leduc No. 1 well in 1947 ushered in a new era in the Western Canadian petroleum industry.

Lithology 
The Leduc Formation consists of fossil reefs that are highly porous, which makes them excellent reservoirs for oil and gas. They were deposited as limestone and mudstone in shallow water reef environments. Stromatoporoids were the primary reef-building organisms, and rock-types range from skeletal mudstones and floatstones to finer grained muddy packstones and wackestones.

Many, but not all, of the reefs were later subjected to dolomitization during diagenesis, which increased their porosity, and they now consist of dolomite rather than limestone. The dolomitization that took place in the region has increased the porosity primarily in the more deeply buried lagoonal back reef facies. The pre-existing porosity has also been preserved well due to the dolomitization. Porosity in the region is dominated by vuggy, moldic, intercrystalline, as well as fracture types of porosity. Generally, the mean porosity of the Leduc Formation is 5.2%, with the permeability of the rocks in the region being an even spread.

Anhydrite is also common in the Leduc Formation, along with the replacement dolomitization.

Oil and gas production 

The Leduc Formation is a major source of oil and natural gas in central Alberta. The Leduc No. 1 well drilled in 1947 produced 50 thousand cubic metres (more than 300 thousand barrels) of oil, marking the beginning of the post-war Albertan oil boom, and contributed to a large population boom in the cities of Calgary and Edmonton.  The discovery and subsequent production from the wells also led to an economic boom in Alberta, which now puts Calgary among the forefront of producers of oil in North America.

The Strachan and Ricinus West gas fields, discovered in 1967 and 1969, are also in Late Devonian Leduc-age reefs. The reefs were found using seismic common-depth point (CDP) techniques, which were being developed and used in the Western Canada Sedimentary Basin. The well that was crucial to the discovery of these two formations was drilled in 1955, and yielded gas as well as some salt water.

Distribution and thickness 
The Leduc Formation occurs as discrete, discontinuous reef "buildups" in a line following the Woodbend shelf margin from Drumheller in central Alberta to the Peace River Arch area in northern Alberta.

Relationship to other units 
In central Alberta the Leduc Formation conformably overlies the platform limestones and dolomites of the Cooking Lake and Beaverhill Lake Formations. In northern Alberta near the Peace River Arch it rests on older red beds or on the Granite Wash. The Leduc reefs are surrounded by shales of the Duvernay and Ireton Formations and the Woodbend Group that were deposited in non-reefal, open marine environments.

The Leduc reefs are the same ages as, but not contiguous with, the reefs of the Cairn Formation farther west. Because the Leduc reefs are not exposed at the surface, the extensive outcrops of the Cairn reefs in the Canadian Rockies have been studied to increase the understanding of the Leduc reefs.

Near the Leduc Formation there is also the Swan Hills Formation. These two formations hold some similarities, such as the types of rocks and certain diagenetic processes. Rock types in both regions are dominated by limestones and dolomites. Dolomitization has taken place in both formations however it is more dominant in the Leduc Formation. Evaporites such as Anhydrites are also more present in the Leduc Formation, however they are also present in the Swan Hills Formation.

The Swan Hills Formation also holds some differences to the Leduc Formation. The porosity types in both formations differ, and the types of fossilized biota also differ. Vuggy, moldic, intercrystalline, and fracture porosities are present in the Leduc Formation whereas the primary porosities in the Swan Hills Formation are interparticle and interfossil. One of the primary fossilized biota in the Leduc Formation are stromatoporoids, whereas the primary fossil type in the Swan Hills Formation are Amphipora.

Fossil content 
The following fossils have been reported from the formation:

Bivalves
 Megalodon sp.
 Modiomorpha sp.
 Turbinopsis sp.
Brachiopods
 Conocardium sp.
 Cranaena sp.
 Schizophoria sp.
Gastropods
 Cypricardinia sp.
 Leptodesma (Leiopteria) sp.
 Archaeogastropoda indet.
Corals

 Actinostroma clathratum
 A. redwaterense
 Anostylostroma laxum
 Atelodictyon cf. stelliferum
 Euryamphipora platyformis
 Ferestromatopora dubia
 Hammatostroma nodosum
 Macgeea parva
 Peneckiella floydensis
 Stachyodes costulata
 Stromatopora cygnea
 Stromatoporella cf. subvesiculosa
 Stromatoporella damnoniensis
 Stromatoporella cf. mirabilis
 Synthetostroma vesiculosum
 Trupetostroma warreni
 Trupetostroma cf. coalescens
 Alveolites sp.
 Amphipora sp.
 Charactophyllum sp.
 Macgeea sp.
 Metriophyllum sp.
 Phacellophyllum sp.
 Phillipsastrea sp.
 Stachyodes sp.
 Syringoporella sp.
 Syringopora sp.
 Tabulophyllum sp.
 Thamnopora sp.
 Zaphrentis sp.
 ?Trupetostroma sp.

References 

Geologic formations of Alberta
Devonian Alberta
Frasnian Stage
Dolomite formations
Limestone formations
Reef deposits
Shallow marine deposits
Reservoir rock formations
Devonian southern paleotropical deposits
Western Canadian Sedimentary Basin
Fossiliferous stratigraphic units of North America
Paleontology in Alberta